Leucotmemis climacina is a moth of the subfamily Arctiinae. It was described by Arthur Gardiner Butler in 1876. It is found in Espírito Santo, Brazil.

References

 Arctiidae genus list at Butterflies and Moths of the World of the Natural History Museum

Leucotmemis
Moths described in 1876